Events in the year 1984 in Turkey.

Parliament
17th Parliament of Turkey

Incumbents
President – Kenan Evren 
Prime Minister – Turgut Özal
Leader of the opposition – Necdet Calp

Ruling party and the main opposition
 Ruling party – Motherland Party (ANAP) 
 Main opposition – People’s Party (HP)

Cabinet
45th government of Turkey (from 21 September)

Events

February 
 18 February – Nazlı Deniz Kuruoğlu wins Miss Europe.

March 
 13 March – President Li Xiannian of China visits Turkey.

May 
 2 May – Turkey and West Germany sign a nuclear energy agreement.
 9 May – Novelist Yaşar Kemal wins Légion d'honneur.
 17 May – Trabzonspor wins the championship

June 
 20 June – Turkey diplomat Erdoğan Özen assassinated by Armenian terrorists in Vienna.

November 
 11 November – Melek Gürkan wins Miss Asia Pacific International.
 19 November – Turkey diplomat Enver Ergun assassinated by Armenian terrorists in Vienna.
 25 November – Professor Muzaffer Aksoy shares the Ramazzini award with Prof. Enrico C. Vigliani.

December 
 25 December – Soviet premier Nikolai Tikhonov arrives in Ankara for official visit.

Births
9 February – Şebnem Schaefer, model
19 February – Onur Tuncer, footballer
26 February – Beren Saat, actress
1 March – İbrahim Şahin, footballer
31 July – İpek Yaylacıoğlu, actress and photographer 
13 August – Ayça Naz İhtiyaroğlu, volleyball player
25 August – Kenan Sofuoğlu, motorcycle racer
2 November – Berrak Tüzünataç, actress
18 November – Melikshah Soyturk, modern Turkish topographic painter
10 December – Şenol Akın, footballer

Deaths
14 January – Fazıl Küçük (born in 1906) former leader of the Turkish Cypriots
25 February – Hasan Hüseyin Korkmazgil (born in 1927), folk poet
19 March – Kerime Nadir (born in 1917), writer
9  September – Yılmaz Güney (born in 1937), actor
28 September – Cihat Baban (born in 1911), former government minister
4  October - Muazzez Tahsin Berkand (born in 1899), writer
4  November – Ümit Yaşar Oğuzcan (born in 1926), poet
8  December – Semih Sancar (born in 1911), former chief of staff

Gallery

See also
Turkey in the Eurovision Song Contest 1984
 1983–84 1.Lig
Turkey at the 1984 Summer Olympics
Turkey at the 1984 Winter Olympics

References

 
Years of the 20th century in Turkey
Turkey
Turkey
Turkey